Hernon is a surname of Irish origin. Notable people with the surname include:

Jimmy Hernon (1924–2009), Scottish footballer
Marcus Hernon (born 1959), Irish flute player
Tom Hernon (1866–1902), American baseball player

See also
Herron (name)

Surnames of Irish origin